The 2000–01 FA Cup (known as The FA Cup sponsored by AXA for sponsorship reasons) was the 120th season of the world's oldest knockout football competition, the FA Cup. The competition was won by Liverpool, who came from 1–0 behind against Arsenal to eventually win 2–1 in the final. The final was played outside England for the first time, at the Millennium Stadium in Cardiff, because Wembley Stadium was being knocked down to be replaced with a new stadium.

First round proper
This round is the first in which teams from the Second Division and Third Division compete with non-League teams.

Second round proper

Third round proper
This round marked the first time First Division and Premier League (top-flight) teams played. The draw for the 3rd round of the FA Cup was taken on Sunday 10 December 2000.

Fourth round proper

Matches played the weekend of 27 January, with replays during the week of 6 February.

Fifth round proper

Matches played weekend of 17 February, with replays on 20 February and 7 March.

The biggest surprises of the round saw Tranmere Rovers complete one of the greatest FA Cup comebacks ever when they beat Southampton 4–3 in a replay after they had been trailing 3–0 at half time. (with 36-year-old former Southampton striker Paul Rideout scoring a hat-trick for Tranmere), while Wycombe Wanderers reached the quarter-finals for the first time in their history with a penalty shoot-out win over Wimbledon that follow two 2–2 draws.

Sixth round proper

Matches were played on 10 & 11 March.

The most significant result of the round was Premier League side Leicester City's 2–1 home defeat to Division Two underdogs Wycombe Wanderers, who had only been in the Football League for eight seasons.

Blackburn Rovers and Tranmere Rovers, the last remaining Division One sides in the competition, were eliminated at this stage by Arsenal and Liverpool respectively.

Semi-finals

Unlike earlier rounds, matches were played on neutral grounds on Sunday, 8 April 2001.

Final

A 72nd-minute goal by Freddie Ljungberg looked to have won the trophy for Arsenal and ended their three-year trophy drought, but two late goals from Michael Owen gave the trophy to a Liverpool side who had already won the League Cup and would then go on to win the UEFA Cup as well. This success made Liverpool only the second side to win the FA Cup and League Cup in the same season - the first being Arsenal in 1993. This was the beginning of a streak in which Arsenal reached the final four times out of five, winning three of those.

Media coverage
In the United Kingdom, ITV were the free to air broadcasters for the fourth consecutive and final season before the BBC regained it while Sky Sports were the subscription broadcasters for the thirteenth consecutive season.

The matches shown live on ITV Sport were: Newcastle United 1-1 Aston Villa (R3); Manchester United 0–1 West Ham United (R4); Liverpool 4–2 Manchester City (R5); Tranmere Rovers 2–4 Liverpool (QF); Wycombe Wanderers 1–2 Liverpool (SF); Liverpool 2–1 Arsenal (Final).

References

External links
FA Cup results and dates from 1st rnd on, and scorers from 5th round on - RSSSF

 
FA Cup seasons
Fa Cup, 2000-01
Fa Cup, 2000-01